Tillandsia superba is a species of flowering plant in the genus Tillandsia. This species is native to Bolivia and Ecuador.

Further reading

superba
Flora of Bolivia
Flora of Ecuador